HD 74772 (d Velorum) is a single star in the southern constellation of Vela. It is positioned near the Vela SNR, which gives it an intense X-ray background. The star is of apparent visual magnitude 4.05, and hence is visible to the naked eye. It is moving closer to the Earth with a heliocentric radial velocity of −2 km/s.

This is an evolved G-type giant star with a stellar classification of G6 III. It has 3.2 times the mass of the Sun and is radiating 128 times the Sun's luminosity from its enlarged photosphere at an effective temperature of 5,210 K.

References

G-type giants
Vela (constellation)
Velorum, d
Durchmusterung objects
074772
042884
3477